Seven Little Monsters, or 7 Little Monsters, is an animated children's television series about a family of seven monsters and their mother. The series, based on the book of the same name, was created by Maurice Sendak and directed by Neil Affleck, Lynn Reist, and Glenn Sylvester. Each monster is named after a different number from one to seven, and each has unique physical characteristics.

Overview
Seven Little Monsters was produced by Wild Things Productions (uncredited), Nelvana, Suzhou Hong Ying Animation Corporation Limited for the first two seasons and Philippine Animation Studio for the third season, in association with Treehouse TV and PBS. The theme song was performed by the Canadian band Barenaked Ladies, also known for performing the theme to CBS’ The Big Bang Theory.

The show originally began airing in the United States on PBS Kids, as part of the weekend PBS Kids Bookworm Bunch block, on September 30, 2000. The first season ended on December 23, 2000, with reruns of the first season continuing through October 2001. The second season ran from November 3, 2001 to January 26, 2002, again during the Bookworm Bunch block. Reruns of the second season continued until September 2004, when the Bookworm Bunch was discontinued.

The third season debuted on January 6, 2003 on PBS Kids, and was paired with The Berenstain Bears in the same half-hour timeslot on weekdays; thus, new episodes were only 15 minutes in duration, as opposed to 30 minutes for the first two seasons. The Berenstain Bears began filling the entire half-hour timeslot on most PBS member stations starting September 15, 2003, resulting in some episodes of the third season of Seven Little Monsters never being broadcast on PBS. Some PBS stations continued airing episodes of the third season until August 2004. By fall 2004, the show was dropped altogether. Reruns of the show in the United States returned on Qubo from October 1, 2011 to January 2, 2015. 

In Canada, it was aired on Treehouse TV from February 4, 2001 to February 3, 2002. The series was then moved to YTV from 2002 to 2005. The UK version (dubbed with British voice actors replacing the original American soundtrack) debuted on Channel 5 in January 2004, as part of the Milkshake! strand.

Characters
 One (Joanne Vannicola) is the oldest and the only monster who can fly. She is a tomboy, a natural athlete who loves sports, and somewhat of a tattletale. She often gets her siblings into trouble, but still cares deeply for them.
 Two (Colin Mochrie) is the most helpful of the monsters and has a prominent nose which he often "sticks in where it doesn't belong".
 Three (Dwayne Hill) is a dramatic monster who takes on a different personality and voice in every episode, often to the dismay of others.
 Four (Seán Cullen) is always bad-tempered and grumpy. He is usually seen with his younger brother Five.
 Five (Seán Cullen) is the biggest and most childlike of the monsters who speaks few words with a thick speech impediment. He has an enormous tongue and a voracious appetite.
 Six (Michele Scarabelli) is the resident ballerina of the group who thinks she is the most beautiful of the monsters. Unlike her sister One, she has more feminine interests. She wears a purple leotard with a white tutu, has a star wand, and speaks with a Queens accent.
 Seven (Seán Cullen) is the youngest who has the ability to unscrew his head. He is the most gentle and timid monster and is afraid of bugs, and speaks in a Boris Karloff-esque voice.
 Mom (Debra McGrath) is the mother of the seven monsters. A kindly, babushka-wearing witch, she is much smaller than her children and speaks with a Polish accent.
 Mary is the monsters' hippie neighbor and good friend. She is the leader of a club called the Purple Pixies, which consists of other club members: Wendy (the only one who talks beside Mary), Angela, and Kate, who dislikes Six, and, always has a gloomy angry look.
 Sam is Five's pet turtle.
 Belinda is the monster family's pet cow.
 Freddie is Mary's pet dog.

Episodes

Season 1 (2000)
All episodes in this season are directed by Glenn Sylvester.

Season 2 (2001–02)
All episodes in this season are directed by Neil Affleck.

Season 3 (2003)
''Note: In the United States, All the episodes in Season 3 (except for episodes 37 & 40) aired with The Berenstain Bears on PBS Kids.

References

External links
 

2000s Canadian animated television series
2000s Canadian children's television series
2000 Canadian television series debuts
2000 Chinese television series debuts
2003 Philippine television series debuts
2004 Canadian television series endings
2002 Chinese television series endings
2004 Philippine television series endings
Canadian children's animated comedy television series
Canadian children's animated fantasy television series
Canadian children's animated supernatural television series
Chinese children's animated comedy television series
Chinese children's animated fantasy television series
Philippine animated television series
Philippine supernatural television series
Canadian preschool education television series
Canadian television shows based on children's books
Animated preschool education television series
2000s preschool education television series
Adaptations of works by Maurice Sendak
English-language television shows
PBS Kids shows
YTV (Canadian TV channel) original programming
Animated television series about monsters
Television series about cattle
Television series by Nelvana
Television shows set in New York City